"Holiday Road" is a 1983 single composed and recorded by American guitarist/singer Lindsey Buckingham. Written for the 1983 film National Lampoon's Vacation, it was also used in the film's sequels National Lampoon's European Vacation (1985), Vegas Vacation (1997) and Vacation (2015). Despite only peaking at No. 82 on the Billboard Hot 100 chart during its original release, it has since become one of Buckingham's best known songs.

Buckingham released a live version of the song on his 2008 album Live at the Bass Performance Hall.In July 2015, a remastered edition of "Holiday Road" was re-released, both on the Vacation soundtrack album and as a digital download along with "Dancin' Across the USA" from the original National Lampoon's Vacation soundtrack.

Background
Following the release of Fleetwood Mac's 1982 album Mirage, Buckingham was approached by actor/director Harold Ramis, who asked him to create two songs for his then-upcoming sophomore theatrical directorial effort National Lampoon's Vacation. Initially reluctant, believing that soundtrack work "wasn't part of his discipline", he ultimately decided to honor Ramis' request. Buckingham recorded "Holiday Road" without seeing the actual film itself, although he inferred that the movie "had to be somewhat uplifting and a little bit funny". As such, he added dog barks near the end of the song, unaware that the movie featured a scene where a dog is accidentally dragged to death from the bumper of a car.

Upon hearing "Holiday Road", Ramis and producer Matty Simmons were surprised with how accurately the song addressed the movie's subject matter. During the same recording sessions as "Holiday Road", Buckingham also wrote "Dancin' Across the USA", a Mills Brothers pastiche intended for the movie's ending credits.

"Holiday Road" debuted at number 92 on the Billboard Hot 100 for the week dated August 6, 1983. In its fourth week on the Hot 100, "Holiday Road" reached its peak of number 82, before then slipping to number 99 in its fifth and final week on the chart.

When asked in a 2017 interview if he was still fond of "Holiday Road", Buckingham replied that "It was one of those things that happened to work very well for the movie". Buckingham elaborated in a later interview that he enjoyed recording "Holiday Road" and remembered that Ramis was "thrilled" when he first heard the song in the studio.

Personnel
Lindsey Buckingham – electric guitar, bass guitar, keyboards, percussion, drum programming, vocals

Charts

Cover versions and usage
The song has been covered by pop punk bands Limp, the Aquabats, Whippersnapper, Matt Pond PA, and Dirt Bike Annie. The indie rock band the Walkmen performed a version of the song in November 2010 for The A.V. Club Holiday Undercover series. In 2015, the country group Zac Brown Band covered the song for the soundtrack of the film Vacation.

In 2013, "Holiday Road" was adopted as the unofficial playoff victory song of the 2013 Chicago Blackhawks, who went on to win the Stanley Cup on June 24, the 30th anniversary of the song's release.  

In 2014, the song was used as the music on television advertising for Teletext Holidays, a British travel agency. The song appears under the closing credits of National Lampoon: Drunk Stoned Brilliant Dead'', a 2015 American documentary film directed by Douglas Tirola about the magazine and its related franchises and influence. A version of the song with rewritten lyrics was used in Honda television commercials in 2017.

A parody of the song, "History Road", is used as a segment intro on the comedy podcast Dynamic Banter, hosted by Mike Falzone and Steve Zaragoza. The parody was made by and features the voice of their friend Owen Carter.

References

External links
 Holiday Road Lyrics

1982 songs
1983 singles
Chicago Blackhawks
Songs written for films
Songs written by Lindsey Buckingham
National Lampoon's Vacation (film series)
Lindsey Buckingham songs
Song recordings produced by Richard Dashut
Warner Records singles